Abigail Marsh (born 1976) is a psychologist and  neuroscientist who works as a professor at Georgetown University's Department of Psychology and the Interdisciplinary Neuroscience Program, where she is the director of the Laboratory on Social and Affective Neuroscience.

Early life and education
Marsh was born in 1976 and is from Tacoma, Washington.

Marsh graduated from Dartmouth College in 1999 with a Bachelor of Arts in psychology. Marsh received her PhD in Social Psychology from Harvard University in 2004, where she previously earned a M.A. in the same discipline in 2001.

Career
After graduating from Harvard, she worked as a postdoctoral researcher at the National Institute of Mental Health until 2008. She then began to work at Georgetown, and in October 2013 was tenured.

Marsh is the director of the Laboratory on Social and Affective Neuroscience at Georgetown which conducts research on empathy, altruism, and other related topics through various methods, such as brain imaging and pharmacological methods. Her research has been funded by the National Institutes of Health, the National Science Foundation, and the John Templeton Foundation. She was appointed to the advisory board for Donor to Donor, an organization that promotes living kidney donation.

Marsh has written articles for Slate, Psychology Today, Business Insider, The Guardian, NPR, The Wall Street Journal, The Chronicle of Higher Education, and other publications. In September 2016, Marsh presented her story and work in a TED talk in Banff, Canada.

Research
Much of Marsh's work pertains to the study of altruism and why people may help others at their own cost. More generally, she researches in the field of social and affective neuroscience and psychology. On the topic of altruism, Marsh's research has yielded more information about the amygdala, showing that in altruists, the amygdalae tend to be larger, and in psychopaths it tends to be smaller. The amygdala is the part of the brain responsible for processing emotions and fear. In 2014, Marsh published a paper in the Proceedings of the National Academy of Sciences that concluded a spectrum existed with extreme altruists on one end and psychopaths at the other. She has also published multiple studies that show, when altruists watch someone else feel pain, they have levels of activity in similar regions of their brain as when they were feeling the pain themselves, and concluded that altruists are better at recognizing the fear of others. Marsh leads work at Georgetown with altruistic donors, particularly those who donated kidneys to strangers.

Her work with children and adolescents has been used to show how different neural workings can lead to behavioral problems. She has studied the brains of children and adults who have psychopathic traits and found that it is strongly inherited, one factor of which is a fearless maternal influence. Children who display risky behavior, she concluded, are more prone to becoming psychopathic, and that such psychopaths are hard to detect as they may believe they are no different than those around them. In 2017 Marsh wrote Good for Nothing about the topic of altruists and psychopaths.

In 2019, Marsh researched altruism in kidney donors and stem cell donors using behavioral investigations and brain imaging, as well as using those methods to study the causes of conduct problems in children and adolescents. In the same year, she led a study that found, among other conclusions, that Americans are surprisingly successful at distinguishing other Americans from Australians by visual cues, like walking, waving one's hand, or smiling.

Awards and recognition
Marsh is a recipient of the National Institute of Mental Health's 2007 Richard J Wyatt Memorial Award for translational research. In 2014, Marsh was awarded the Cozzarelli Prize for research on altruism she had published in the Proceedings of the National Academy of Sciences. The research she coauthored studied "extraordinary altruists", using people who donated kidneys to strangers. In 2016, Marsh was named a fellow in the Society for Personality and Social Psychology. In 2017, the S&R Foundation awarded Marsh their Kuno Award for Applied Science for the Social Good. In 2018, Marsh was awarded the Book Prize for the Promotion of Social and Personality Science by the Society for Personality and Social Psychology for her book The Fear Factor.

The Fear Factor
Marsh published The Fear Factor in 2017, a book about her research on aggression, altruism, and empathy in the context of neuroscience. The full title is The Fear Factor: How One Emotion Connects Altruists, Psychopaths, and Everyone In-Between.

See also
Altruism
Amygdala

References

External links
Personal website

American women neuroscientists
American neuroscientists
1976 births
Dartmouth College alumni
Harvard University alumni
Georgetown University faculty
Living people
American women psychologists
21st-century American psychologists
People from Tacoma, Washington
American women academics
21st-century American women